Jagdish N. Sheth (born 1938) is the Charles H. Kellstadt Professor of Marketing at the Goizueta Business School of Emory University.  He was a prominent member of the core team during the initial years of the Indian Institute of Management Calcutta, the first Indian Institute of Management. Prof. Sheth was awarded by Padma Bhushan 2020 for his work in literature & education in United States.

Early days
Sheth was born in Burma (now Myanmar) in a Jain family, where his father had migrated from Western India to set up a business as a rice merchant . In 1941, the family emigrated as a refugees in wake of Japanese invasion of Burma to India. He received most of his schooling in Madras (now Chennai).  It was here that he met his future wife, Madhuri Shah, at a local literacy society for high school students that he had founded.

Academic career
Sheth came to the United States to further his academic career and received his MBA at the University of Pittsburgh in 1962.  He was fascinated by the psychological theories being advanced at that time and pursued a career in academia.  During the mid-1960s he studied and researched at MIT, Columbia and the University of Pittsburgh, where he received his PhD in 1966 from its Katz Graduate School of Business.  It was during this period that he started developing his "Theory of Buyer Behavior."  A book that he co-authored with his mentor Professor John Howard provided the foundation for the future of research in the field of consumer psychology and marketing.

In 2017, he was named a fellow of the Association for Consumer Research.

Writings and activities
Sheth has published more than 200 articles in journals and has written a number of books.  His books include Tectonic Shift: The Geoeconomic Realignment of Globalizing Markets with Rajendra S. Sisodia, The Rule of Three: Surviving and Thriving in Competitive Markets, Clients for Life: How Great Professionals Develop Breakthrough Relationships, and Handbook of Relationship Marketing. In 2007, he published The Self-Destructive Habits of Good Companies.   In 2008, he published Chindia Rising.  In 2014, he published The Accidental Scholar.

The "Sheth Family Foundation" has established Sheth International Awards at the University of Pittsburgh's University Center for International Studies.

In 2003, Sheth founded the "India, China & America Institute" (ICA Institute), a non-profit group that published newsletters and held seminars related to emerging markets, commercial growth, and alignment of policies between those three nations.

He was also founding chairman of the Academic Council of the Mumbai Business School, a business school located in Mumbai, India, but which closed after attracting just 15 students.

References

External links
Sheth's Official Web site
Emory's Profile of Jagdish Sheth
India, China & America Institute

Joseph M. Katz Graduate School of Business alumni
University of Pittsburgh faculty
21st-century American psychologists
Living people
Gujarati people
Marketing people
American marketing people
1938 births
Emory University faculty
University of Illinois Urbana-Champaign faculty
Academic staff of the Indian Institute of Management Calcutta
American Jains
American academics of Indian descent
Recipients of the Padma Bhushan in literature & education
Indian scholars
20th-century American psychologists